The Friendship Fountain, also known as Dancing Dolphins, is a 1987 sculpture depicting three dolphins by James "Bud" Bottoms and Octavio González, installed along Puerto Vallarta's Malecón, in the Mexican state of Jalisco.

See also

 1987 in art

References

External links
 

1987 establishments in Mexico
1987 sculptures
Animal sculptures in Mexico
Centro, Puerto Vallarta
Dolphins in art
Outdoor sculptures in Puerto Vallarta
Statues in Jalisco